Stieg is both a surname and a variant of the Scandinavian masculine given name Stig. Notable people with the name include:

Surname
Philip Stieg (born 1952), American academic physician and neurosurgeon

Given name
Stieg Hedlund (born 1965), American video game designer, artist and writer
Stieg Larsson (1954–2004), Swedish journalist and writer
Stieg Persson (born 1959), Australian contemporary artist
Stieg Trenter (1914–1967), Swedish journalist writer

Masculine given names